The Dalhousie Tigers women's ice hockey program represents Dalhousie University in the Atlantic University Sport conference of U Sports. The current head coach is Troy Ryan, who was hired in July 2020. Ryan has not yet coached, as the 2020-21 AUS season was shelved due to the Covid-19 pandemic. The program played at the Dalhousie Memorial Arena until 2012. Since then, the Tigers men's and women's ice hockey teams compete at the Halifax Forum.

History
Tigers assistant coach Savannah Newton, who played at the NCAA level with the Boston University Terriers, was among 18 former student-athletes selected for the 2021 U SPORTS Female Apprentice Coach Program. In celebration of International Women’s Day, involving apprentice coaches (former student-athletes) with a mentor head coach, the purpose of the program is geared towards increasing the number of women in coaching positions across Canadian universities.

Season-by-season Record

Season team scoring champion

All-time scoring leaders

International
Natalie Stanwood, Defense, : Ice hockey at the 2019 Winter Universiade

Awards and honours

AUS honours
2002-03: Amy Graham - AUS Most Sportsmanlike Player
2005-06: Lesley Jordan - AUS Coach of the Year
2007-08: Jocelyn Leblanc - AUS Rookie of the Year

AUS All-Stars

First Team
2002-03: Lindsay White 
2005-06: Leah Merkley
2009-10: Jocelyn Leblanc
2010-11: Laura Shearer
2014-15: Lisa MacLean
2016-17: Lisa MacLean

Second Team
2001-02: Heather MacDonald
2002-03: Amy Graham
2003-04: Leah Merkley, Lindsay White 
2004-05: Sarah Backman, Jen Smith, Lindsay White 
2005-06: Sarah Backman
2006-07: Kristen Ladouceur
2007-08: Jocelyn Leblanc, Laura Shearer

Second Team (cont'd)
2008-09: Kim Carcary, Jocelyn Leblanc
2009-10: Laura Shearer
2010-11: Jocelyn Leblanc
2011-12: Jocelyn Leblanc
2015-16: Lisa MacLean
2017-18: Lisa MacLean
2018-19: Natalie Stanwood

AUS All-Rookie
2005-06: Sarah Beckman
2006-07: Emelie Ederfors
2007-08: Jocelyn Leblanc
2009-10: Fielding Montgomery
2011-12: Brittany McMaken, Sarah Robichaud
2013-14: Lisa MacLean
2014-15: Jessica Severyns
2016-17: Fabiana Petricca

AUS Community Service Award
2002-03: Lori Jones
2005-06: Leah Kutcher
2009-10: Kaitlyn McNutt
2014-15: Sarah MacNeil
2015-16: Sarah MacNeil
2019-20: Annika Rose

USports honours
2005-06: Lesley Jordan, USports Coach of the Year

USports All-Rookie
2007-08: Jocelyn Leblanc

Marion Hilliard Award
2005-06: Leah Kutcher
2009-10: Kaitlyn McNutt

University Awards
2005-06: Ellen Wright - Dalhousie Tigers Athletics Female Rookie of the Year Award 
2005-06: Leah Kutcher - Dalhousie Tigers Athletics President's Award
2007-08: Jocelyn LeBlanc - Dalhousie Tigers Athletics Female Rookie of the Year Award
2009-10: Kaitlyn McNutt - Dalhousie Tigers Athletics President's Award

Team Awards

Most Valuable Player

2002-03: Amy Graham
2003-04: Jen Smith
2004-05: Jen Smith
2005-06: Kristen Ladouceur
2006-07: Leah Merkley
2007-08: Kim Carcary
2008-09: Kim Carcary
2009-10: Jocelyn Leblanc

2010-11: Laura Shearer
2011-12: Jocelyn Leblanc
2012-13: Not Awarded
2013-14: Fielding Montgomery
2014-15: Lisa MacLean
2015-16: Sara Robichaud
2016-17: Lisa MacLean
2017-18: Lisa MacLean
2018-19: Fabiana Petricca

2019-20: Natalie Stanwood

Tigers in professional hockey

References

 

U Sports women's ice hockey teams
Women's ice hockey teams in Canada
Ice hockey teams in Ontario
Dalhousie University
Women in Nova Scotia